Serellan is an American video game developer founded in 2011 by Christian Allen. The company has released one video game currently, Takedown: Red Sabre for Microsoft Windows and Xbox Live Arcade. Their second title, EPSILON, is currently on Steam Early Access.

History
Serellan was founded by Christian Allen in 2011. Prior to the company's establishment, Allen was lead designer for Ghost Recon: Advanced Warfighter and Halo: Reach.

In June 2012, after the closure of Zipper Interactive, former staff Mark Nicolino and Reed Gonsalves joined Serellan.

Serellan's first game was Takedown: Red Sabre. Originally titled as just Takedown, its development was financed through a crowdfunding campaign on Kickstarter. It reached its $200,000 goal on April 2, 2012, with the final tally being at $221,833. The game was released in 2013 for Microsoft Windows and in 2014 for Xbox 360. The Xbox 360 version was delayed due to not passing certification requirements.

Games
 Takedown: Red Sabre
 EPSILON
 Hotel Blind

References

External links
 

American companies established in 2011
Video game companies established in 2011
Video game companies of the United States
Video game development companies
2011 establishments in Washington (state)
Companies based in Seattle